Villers-aux-Tours is a village in Wallonia and a district of the municipality of Anthisnes, located in the province of Liège, Belgium.

The village is mentioned in written sources for the first time at the and of the 13th century. The  was constructed at the end of the 17th century for the Rahier-Argenteau family, an inscription above the entrance gate bears the date 1688.

References

External links

Populated places in Liège Province